Johan Sköld (born 28 February 1975) is a Swedish professional golfer.

Sköld turned professional in 1996 and secured his European Tour card at the 1996 Qualifying School, but would struggle to stay up. He returned to the 2000 European Tour after an eighth place in the Challenge Tour Grand Final in Cuba, again after winning the 2001 European Tour Qualifying School, and later qualified for the 2005 European Tour.

Sköld played a total of 133 events on the European Tour between 1997 and 2009, earning over half a million euro. His best result was a tie for fifth at the 2006 Celtic Manor Wales Open, six strokes behind winner Robert Karlsson.

On the Challenge Tour, Sköld had eight top ten finishes in 1999. His best result was a tie for third at the 2006 MAN NÖ Open. He won the 27th Nigerian Open in 1999.

Professional wins (1)
1999 Nigerian Open

References

External links

Swedish male golfers
European Tour golfers
Sportspeople from Stockholm County
People from Håbo Municipality
People from Sollentuna Municipality
1975 births
Living people